The 2022 Tuks International was a professional tennis tournament played on outdoor hard courts. It was the third edition of the tournament which was part of the 2022 ITF Women's World Tennis Tour. It took place in Pretoria, South Africa between 28 March and 3 April 2022.

Singles main draw entrants

Seeds

 1 Rankings are as of 21 March 2022.

Other entrants
The following players received wildcards into the singles main draw:
  Isabella Kruger
  Zoë Kruger
  Relebogile Sereo
  Tayla Wilmot

The following player received entry using a protected ranking:
  Katharina Hobgarski

The following players received entry from the qualifying draw:
  Eudice Chong
  Tamara Čurović
  Anna Gabric
  Adrienn Nagy
  Sandra Samir
  Cody Wong Hong-yi

Champions

Singles

  Anastasia Tikhonova def.  Lina Glushko, 5–7, 6–3, 6–3

Doubles

  Eudice Chong /  Cody Wong Hong-yi def.  Tímea Babos /  Valeria Savinykh, 7–5, 5–7, [13–11]

References

External links
 2022 Tuks International at ITFtennis.com
 Official website

2022 ITF Women's World Tennis Tour
2022 in South African sport
March 2022 sports events in Africa
April 2022 sports events in Africa